Centre d'Instruction des Equipages d'Hélicoptères 341 Colonel Alexis Santini is a French Air and Space Force training unit located at Orange-Caritat Air Base, Vaucluse, France which operates the Eurocopter Fennec.

See also

 List of French Air and Space Force aircraft squadrons

References

French Air and Space Force squadrons